Although information has been bought and sold since ancient times, the idea of an information marketplace is relatively recent. The nature of such markets is still evolving, which complicates development of  sustainable business models.  However, certain attributes of information markets are beginning to be understood, such as diminished participation costs, opportunities for customization, shifting customer relations, and a need for order.

Overview
In describing the idea of information markets, Mcgee and Prusak (1993) note that people barter for information, use it as an instrument of power, or trade it for information of greater value.  In contrast, Shapiro and Varian (1999) point out that historical leaders in information markets, such as newspapers and encyclopedias are at risk of losing their positions as new technology greatly reduces the cost of creating and distributing information.  They also indicate that information markets will not resemble textbook competitive markets with many suppliers offering similar products but lacking the ability to influence prices.

In describing the transition from traditional to information markets, Simard (2005) used a metaphor of autonomous providers and users exchanging information in place of sellers and buyers trading goods and services, respectively.  Martin (1996) indicates that as manufacturing shifts from mass production to customization, marketing should shift to individualization.  Similarly, Mcgee and Prusak (1993) state that with the increased capacity for customization, information about products and services will become an increasingly important resource.

Hagel and Rayport (1997) focus on customer relations.  Although businesses assume that information about customers is freely available for the taking, as customers assume greater control of this information, access will likely become more difficult.  Further, as ownership of information shifts to the customer, a new source of supply is created and there may be opportunities for intermediaries to add value by linking this supply with business demand.

Although Web-enabled information markets resemble the frontier-style "old west", Sparr (2001) states that governments will eventually find ways to step in with standards, property rights, and regulations, as all economic activity ultimately depends on order.  This has virtually always been the case in the past and there is no reason to expect that the Net will be different.

For Linde and Stock (2011) the information market is the market for digital information distributed via networks. Traded are all sort of software applications and of content (from blogs via images, films and games up to scientific articles and patents). I-Commerce is the e-commerce with (digital) information.

See also
 Content (media and publishing)
 Information economy
 Information society
 Intellectual property
 Internet economy
 Know-how trading
 Knowledge economy
 Knowledge market
 Market for zero-day exploits
 Prediction market

References

Economic systems
Information economics
Information Age
Business intelligence terms